The Chinese women's cricket team is the team that represents China in international women's cricket matches.

The first time Chinese women cricketers making their international debut was in September 2006 in a Sixes game against Scotland in Shanghai, losing by 59 runs. However, the side was not recognised by the Chinese Cricket Association as the official team.

The official Chinese National Women Team was incepted in May 2007.  After the National Cricket Tournament Final, a total of 21 girls from 19 school teams were gathered in Shenzhen and underwent vigorous centralised training before a final 14 squad was sent to Bangkok for the ACC Women's Tournament 2007.  The team turn up to be a semi-finalist.

The team was coached by Rashid Khan and captained by MEI Chun-hua, a right arm fast-bowler and final year student from the Shanghai Tongji University. Other notable players included WANG Meng, a consistent fast bowler and HU Tingting, who turned up to be the best batsman for China during the ACC Tournament. Both WANG and HU were students from the Shenyang Sports Institute.

In April 2018, the International Cricket Council (ICC) decided to grant full Women's Twenty20 International (WT20I) status to all its members. Therefore, all Twenty20 matches played between China women and other ICC members after 1 July 2018 will be a full WT20I.

On 13 January 2019, in their match against the UAE, the team was bowled out for 14 runs, at the time the lowest total in a Women's T20I match.

In December 2020, the ICC announced the qualification pathway for the 2023 ICC Women's T20 World Cup. China were named in the 2021 ICC Women's T20 World Cup Asia Qualifier regional group, alongside seven other teams.

Tournament history

Asian Games
 2010: 4th
 2014: 4th

Women's T20 World Cup Qualifier
 2015: 6th

Women's East Asia Cup 
2015: Won
2017: 3rd place
2019: Won

Records and Statistics 

International Match Summary — China Women
 
Last updated 22 September 2019

Twenty20 International 

 Highest team total: 132/6 v. South Korea on 20 September 2019 at Yeonhui Cricket Ground, Incheon. 
 Highest individual score: 55, Zhang Chan v. South Korea on 3 November 2018 at Yeonhui Cricket Ground, Incheon.  
 Best individual bowling figures: 4/7, Wu Juan v. South Korea on 20 September 2019 at Yeonhui Cricket Ground, Incheon.  

Most T20I runs for China Women

Most T20I wickets for China Women 

T20I record versus other nations

Records complete to WT20I #767. Last updated 22 September 2019.

Current squad
 Huang Zhuo (c)
 Caiyun Zhao
 Chai Yudian(柴雨点) (wk)
 Han Lili
 Li Yingying
 Liu Jie
 Reziye
 Song Yang Yang
 Sun Meng Yao(孙梦瑶)
 Tian Qi
 Wang Meng
 Wu Juan
 Xiang Ruan(阮香)
 Zhao Ning(赵宁)

See also
 List of China women Twenty20 International cricketers
 Chinese men's cricket team
 Chinese Cricket Association
 Asian Cricket Council

References

Cricket in China
Cricket
Women's national cricket teams
Women